Chromosome 6 open reading frame 203 is a protein that in humans is encoded by the C6orf203 gene.

C6orf203 protein is reported to be localised to the mitochondria of eukaryotes and possess an evolutionarily conserved RNA-binding domain.

One study propose C6orf203 to associate with mitochondrial RNA polymerase (POLRMT) and increase mitochondrial transcription to protect the cell from mitochondrial RNA loss during stress. However, another study propose C6orf203 to associate with the mitoribosomal large subunit and regulate mitochondrial translation.

References

Further reading